Nimibutr Stadium (sometimes referred to as Nimibutr Gymnasium) is an indoor sporting arena located in Bangkok, Thailand. The capacity of the arena is 5,600 spectators. It was built in 1963 and is part of the National Stadium complex.

It is used for a variety of indoor sports such as badminton, handball, basketball, futsal, gymnastics and boxing. It has also hosted concerts.

Past sports events hosted at the stadium

Badminton 
 2012 Thailand Open Grand Prix Gold 
 2013 Thailand Open Grand Prix Gold 
 2016 Thailand Masters Grand Prix Gold
 2016 Thailand Open Grand Prix Gold
 2017 Thailand Masters Grand Prix Gold
 2017 Thailand Open Grand Prix Gold
 2018 Thailand Masters (badminton)
 2018 Thailand Open (badminton)
 2022 BWF World Tour Finals
 2023 Thailand Masters (badminton)

Basketball 
 Basketball at the 1966 Asian Games 
 Basketball at the 1970 Asian Games
 Basketball at the 1978 Asian Games 
 2007 Summer Universiade

Boxing 
 2003 World Amateur Boxing Championships

Cycling 
 Indoor cycling at the 2005 Asian Indoor Games

Futsal 
 2000 AFC Futsal Championship 
 2008 AFC Futsal Championship  
 2008 AFF Futsal Championship 
 2012 FIFA Futsal World Cup

Gymnastics 
 2017 Asian Artistic Gymnastics Championships

Handball 
 2002 Asian Men's Junior Handball Championship
 2005 Asian Women's Youth Handball Championship 
 2005 Asian Men's Youth Handball Championship 
 2006 Asian Men's Handball Championship 
 2008 Asian Women's Handball Championship

Muay Thai 
 Muay Thai at the 2009 Asian Martial Arts Games

Transportation
Nimibutr Stadium is accessible from  National Stadium BTS Station of the BTS Skytrain.

References

Indoor arenas in Thailand
Sports venues completed in 1963
1963 establishments in Thailand
Sport in Bangkok
Badminton in Thailand
Badminton venues
Basketball venues in Thailand